Red Rockets Glare is a Portland, OR recording studio, founded by musician, producer, and engineer Raymond Richards in 2003. The associated record label, Red Rockets Glare Records, has signed bands such as Frankel and the Leviathan Brothers, while artists that have recorded at the studio include The Broken West,
Chapin Sisters, The Fling, The Monolators and My Own Holiday. Richards frequently produces albums at the studio, including Catch the Brass Ring (2007) by
Ferraby Lionheart and Gorilla Manor (2009) by Local Natives.

History

Founding
Before founding the studio in 2003, producer and musician Raymond Richards began working as a touring pedal steel guitarist in 2001. He toured with artists including Mojave 3, Hope Sandoval & the Warm Inventions, Lisa Germano and The Brian Jonestown Massacre, while also attending the Academy of Art University in San Francisco from 2001 to 2004. He began collecting vintage gear and building his own microphones and pre-amplifiers, and started working as a producer at Red Rockets Glare in April 2003, founding the studio in the residential Rancho Park section of Los Angeles. The Studio was founded partly to help record the music of his own band, The Idaho Falls.

Early releases
The Monolators recorded their 2005 album Our Tears Have Wings at the studio, and stated in 2006, "Red Rockets Glare was a converted garage. Unlike our garage, though, it's nice and comfortable and sound-treated inside, and, oh, it doesn't leak when it rains and form large patches of mold on the floor. That is fortunate."

Los Angeles power pop band Broken West recorded their debut album I Can't Go On, I'll Go On at the studio over the course of a year (July 2005-August 2006) with Richards engineering.  and Richards worked with Ferraby Lionheart to record 2007's Catch the Brass Ring. "Making this album was a real adventure," Lionheart said in a press release. "I met a guy with a cool little garage studio in West L.A. The place was packed with instruments and vintage gear; I tried to use it all."

Frankel, the folk pop solo recording project of Michael Orendy, has released an album on the Red Rockets Glare record label,  Lullaby for the Passersby in 2007. Group Leviathan Brothers recorded their second jazz EP "The Man Who Lost His Shadow" (2007) at the studio and released it on Red Rockets Glare Records. Their third EP, "Short Stories", was released in 2008 and recorded by Richards at Hot Pie Studios in Pasadena, California.

Don't Dance by The Monolators was produced, recorded and engineered by Richards at the studio, and released in October 2008. The Sweet Hurt works with Richards at the studio. About her experience first recording Everyday Mistakes over three days at the studio, "It was the most polished-sounding thing I'd done. I learned a lot from that recording process. It was inspiring. Raymond really encouraged me to keep doing the music thing, so I recorded another batch of songs at the studio and that's how the new EP came about." In June 2008 The Sweet Hurt released In The Shade of Dreams, their new EP, on Red Rockets Glare Records.

Gorilla Manor (2008)

Local Natives stated in a 2009 interview, "To record Gorilla Manor, we stumbled upon a gentlemen by the name of Raymond Richards who runs a little studio in Rancho Park called Red Rockets Glare." "We contacted him and he had a really great vibe... we clicked right away. We did everything you heard on Gorilla Manor with him." "All of out prior recording experiences had been very stiff and stale so one of our biggest goals going in was to get more of a natural and more relaxed sound."
According to a 2010 review, "Local Natives'... self-funded album Gorilla Manor, produced by the excellent Raymond Richards here in LA, maintains everything I love about their live shows – a controlled ruckus filled with passionate percussion and beautiful melodies."

Recent recordings
Bands that Richards produced in 2009 included Salt Petal and The Fling. In 2010 Richards recorded one of the songs on the new Henry Clay People album The Fall Trees, and that year Produced country rockers Honey Honey, and A House For Lions. Miles Kurosky's solo debut, The Desert of Shallow Effects (2010), was recorded at Red Rockets Glare, and according to a review the album "works the same vein of melodic, intelligent pop that deemed so much of his former group’s catalog essential listening." A version of the Kurosky session for Aquarium Drunkard recorded at the studio in February 2010, was played on SIRIUS XMU in April of that year.

In 2011 Richards produced records for Count Fleet, Salt Petal, Will Courtney and Warships. Richards played bass on and produced the new record by Marvelous Toy. The Parson Red Heads have included Richards as an occasional band member, and he produced their 2011 album Yearling, released on Arena Rock Records. The first part of Yearling was recorded over several months at the studio. Artists that Richards produced at the studio in early 2013 included John Isaac Watters, Jody Glenham, The Picture & The Frame, The Blank Tapes, and Local Natives. Staff band Young Creatures also records at the studio.

Equipment
Much of the gear is vintage, related to equipment used by The Beatles in their London studios, or is hand-crafted by Richards. Starting in 2009, the following equipment has been added to the studio:

Organs
Farfisa Compact organ
Lowrey Heritage organ, vintage, with a built in Leslie speaker (similar to the one the Beatles used at Abbey Road)

Recording
Trident 80B Mixing Board, previously owned by Jim James and Dan Fogelberg
Neve 1084 mic preamp and eq by Brent Averill Enterprises
Telefunken V72a Tube Mic Preamp
UA 2-610 All tube mic pre
Royer-Made U67
SM-57's, 58's
Coles 4038 Ribbon Mic
Sony C38b
Vintage Sennheiser MD 421
2 AKG D19c

Compressors
Chandler TG-1 Abbey Road Limiter (copy of the compressors on the Beatles Mixing board)
2 1176 compressors from the 1970s
Retro Sta-Level tube compressor
JDK stereo compressor

Instruments

Silvertone 1443 Bass with flat wounds (on loan from Jen Finch of L7)
Roland JUno 60 Synth
Omnichord synth
Roland Space Echo, vintage
Fulltone Tube Tape Echo
Spring reverb units

Other instruments
Fender Jazz Bass,
Several vintage guitars
1954s WFL (Ludwig)  Drum kit (22, 16, 10)

Artists
Artists who have recorded at Red Rockets Glare include:

A House For Lions
Angela Correa (Correatown)
Andrew Deadman
The Broken West
The Blank Tapes
Calamity Magnet
Chapin Sisters
Count Fleet
The ExFriends
The Grizzly Owls
Groupee.com
The Harpeth Trace
The Henry Clay People
The Idaho Falls
John Isaac Watters
Ferraby Lionheart
The Fling
Frankel
Jody Glenham
Laura Laura (Richards plays guitar in 2012)
Leslie and the Badgers
Leviathan Brothers
Local Natives
Let's Go Sailing
Marvelous Toy
The Monolators
Miles Kurosky
Mississippi Man
My Own Holiday
Naomi Greenwald
The Parson Red Heads
The Picture & The Frame
Red Cortez
Salt Petal
Shelley Short
Stevenson Ranch Davidians
The Sweet Hurt
Travel by Sea
Will Courtney
Warships

Discography
The following albums were recorded at the studio:

See also
List of record labels

References

External links
 

 
Recording studios in California
American record labels